The Christian Girls Higher Secondary School is a secondary school in Tura, Meghalaya, India.  It is one of the oldest schools in the state of Meghalaya, as well as in the whole of the north-east of India. It was established in 1920, in its present location. The history of its formation dates back to 1874. "Wangala", the traditional dance form of "the Garos" (known as "A`chik" in the local language, and "Mande" in Bangladesh) is taught as part of the school curriculum.

History

Mentions of schools for Garo girls were first made by Dr. Miles Bronson in 1868; followed by Dr. Stoddard who wrote of a girls' school at Rajasimla. In 1874 Mrs. Keith opened a Boarding School for Garo girls in Goalpara. When M. C. Mason and E. G. Phillips arrived in Goalpara, they asked the 'Women's Society' for a special school for Garo girls. As a result, Ms. Marian Russell arrived in Tura in 1879, with the specific purpose of opening such a school.

In 1883, Ms. Russell went to Nishangram and built a school out of bamboo. Thirty eight girls, mostly grown-ups, came to her.

References

Girls' schools in Meghalaya